In 1992, Spain had competitors in archery, wheelchair basketball, swimming, weightlifting, shooting, boccia, cycling, fencing, judo, tennis, 7-per-side football, table tennis and athletics.

Spain won 34 gold medal, 31 silver medals and 42 bronze medals. Spain finished fifth in total medals.

Background
The Games were held in Barcelona. Competitors with spinal cord injuries, amputations, cerebral palsy, Les Autres and vision impairments were eligible to compete in these Games.

Hosting 

In 1992, the Games were held at home for Spain, with the Games being staged in Barcelona. 82 countries participated.  These were the first Games to be broadcast live on television.  The Games used the same venues as the Summer Olympics.

Organizers decided to not charge an admission fee to events in order to attempt to foster interest locally in disability sport. Domestically, there was very little interest in the Paralympic Games when compared to the Olympic Games.

Intellectual disabilities 
A separate competition was held in Madrid where competitors with intellectual disabilities competed that ran immediately following the completion of the 1992 Paralympics. The Games were sponsored by the Association Nacional Prestura de Servicio (ANDE) and sanctioned by the International Coordinating Committee of World Sport Organizations for the Disabled and the International Association of Sport for the Mentally Handicapped  Spain led efforts to include competitors with intellectual disabilities into the Paralympic movement, creating an international federation for these competitors in 1986.

Archery 

1 of Spain's silver medals came in archery.  It was won by an archer with a physical disability.

Athletics

22 of Spain's gold medals, 14 silver medals and 12 bronze medals came in athletics. 35 medals were won by athletes with vision impairments, 9 by athletes with physical disabilities and 4 by athletes with cerebral palsy.

Boccia 

2 of Spain's gold medals came in boccia.  Both were won by players with cerebral palsy.

Cycling 

1 of Spain's gold medals and 3 bronze medals came in cycling. 2 medals were won by athletes with vision impairments, and 2 with physical disabilities.

Wheelchair fencing 

1 of Spain's gold medals and 2 bronze medals  came in fencing.  All were won by fencers with physical disabilities.

Judo 

1 of Spain's gold medals, 1 silver medal came in athletics. Both were won by athletes with vision impairments.

Shooting 

1 of Spain's silver medals came in shooting. It was won by a shooter with a physical disability.

Swimming 

7 of Spain's gold medals, 14 silver medals and 22 bronze medals came in swimming. 9 medals were won by swimmers with vision impairments, 28 by swimmers with physical disabilities and 6 by swimmers with cerebral palsy.

Table tennis 

3 of Spain's bronze medals came in table tennis.  All medals were won by table tennis players with physical disabilities.

Wheelchair basketball

When Spain played the United States on the second day of competition, 12,500 people were in attendance.  Organizers had to turn away 4,000 people who had wanted to attend.  Philip Craven, future President of the International Paralympic Committee, played his first Paralympic Games wheelchair basketball at these games when he scored 30 points against the Spanish team.

References

Nations at the 1992 Summer Paralympics
2012
1992 in Spanish sport